Tom Strzalkowski (born December 30, 1971) is an American fencer. He competed in the individual and team sabre events at the 1996 Summer Olympics.

See also
List of Pennsylvania State University Olympians

References

External links
 

1971 births
Living people
American male sabre fencers
Olympic fencers of the United States
Fencers at the 1996 Summer Olympics
Sportspeople from Kraków
Polish emigrants to the United States
Pan American Games medalists in fencing
Pan American Games gold medalists for the United States
Fencers at the 1995 Pan American Games